The Women of Brewster Place is an American television miniseries that was broadcast on March 19 and 20, 1989 on ABC. The miniseries is based upon the critically acclaimed 1982 novel of the same name by Gloria Naylor. It was produced by Oprah Winfrey's Harpo Productions with a teleplay by Karen Hall. The show's theme song was performed by American R&B singer Vesta Williams, who performed both the opening and closing credits.

The miniseries stars an ensemble cast of African-American actors and actresses such as Cicely Tyson, Oprah Winfrey, Jackée Harry, Robin Givens, Lynn Whitfield, Paula Kelly, Lonette McKee, Paul Winfield, Mary Alice, Olivia Cole, Moses Gunn, William Allen Young, and a brief early appearance by a young Larenz Tate. 

In 1990, it was adapted into a weekly series entitled Brewster Place.

Plot
Mattie Michael resides on a farm with her parents. After she becomes pregnant by local womanizer Butch Fuller, Mattie leaves home and stays with her friend Etta Mae Johnson until her son Basil is born. When Etta Mae moves to New York City, Mattie struggles to find another place to live. By chance, she meets an old woman, Miss Eva Turner, who allows Mattie and Basil to live with her, and her baby granddaughter Ciel. When Miss Eva dies unexpectedly, Ciel's parents reappear, and take her with them. Mattie buys the house, using the money she secretly set aside for the rent that Miss Eva never charged.

Basil grows into a spoiled, irresponsible young man due to Mattie's overbearing parenting.  One night Basil is arrested and thrown in jail for killing a man during a bar fight. Mattie puts up her house as bail for Basil, but when he flees town, Mattie is forced to leave her home.

With nowhere else to go, she moves to Brewster Place, a run-down urban tenement, where she is welcomed by the now-adult Ciel and her infant daughter Serena. Mattie helps Ciel deal with her itinerant husband, Gene, who rejects the prospect of a second baby, resulting in Ciel's having an abortion.

Other residents of Brewster Place include Ben, the elderly handyman; Cora Lee, a welfare mother with six unruly children by different fathers; Miss Sophie, an elderly self-righteous gossip; and a young educated couple, Melanie "Kiswana" Browne and her boyfriend Abshu. Each of these characters have their own subplots which occasionally intersect with Mattie. Melanie and Abshu start a tenants' association to take action against the landlord for lack of building maintenance.

A lesbian couple, Lorraine and Theresa, move into Brewster Place and are victims of Miss Sophie's homophobia. Lorraine is raped by drug dealer C.C. Baker, who leaves her, bleeding and battered, behind the trash cans near the brick wall. Ben discovers Lorraine and attempts to help her. But Lorraine, traumatized for the attack, mistakes him for C.C. and attacks him with a board. She holds off all the other residents until the ambulance arrives. Both she and an unconscious Ben are driven away with Tee, who is alerted by a neighbor. Mattie, whose anger has finally overcome her apathy towards life, grabs a crowbar and starts to chip away at the much-despised brick wall. All the other residents grab tools and, finally coming together as a community, join together in knocking down the wall.

Cast
 Oprah Winfrey as Mattie Michael
 Robin Givens as Melanie "Kiswana" Browne
 Jackée as Etta Mae Johnson
 Lynn Whitfield as Lucielia "Ciel" Turner
 Paula Kelly as Theresa
 Lonette McKee as Lorraine
 Olivia Cole as Miss Sophie
 Phyllis Yvonne Stickney as Cora Lee
 Moses Gunn as Ben, The Handyman
 William Allen Young as Eugene, Ciel's Husband
 Leon as Abshu, Kiswana's Boyfriend
 Douglas Turner Ward as Reverend Woods
 Glenn Plummer as C.C. Baker
 Barbara Montgomery as Miss Eva Turner, Ciel's Grandmother
 Eugene Lee as Basil, Mattie's Son
 Paul Winfield as Sam Michael, Mattie's Father
 Mary Alice as Fannie Michael, Mattie's Mother
 Cicely Tyson as Mrs. Browne, Kiswana's Mother
 Larenz Tate as Sammy, Cora Lee's Son

Ratings

Awards and nominations

References

Further reading
  (via FindArticles)

External links
 
  The Women of Brewster Place at Paley Center for Media
  The Women of Brewster Place at Museum of Broadcast Communications (Archive)

1989 television films
1989 films
1980s American LGBT-related drama television series
1980s American television miniseries
1989 drama films
1989 LGBT-related films
African-American LGBT-related films
American LGBT-related films
Films scored by David Shire
Lesbian-related television shows
Television shows based on American novels
Television series by Harpo Productions
1980s American films